The Senate is the upper house of the French Parliament, with the lower house being the National Assembly, the two houses constituting the legislature of France.  The French Senate is made up of 348 senators (sénateurs and sénatrices) elected by part of the country's local councillors (in indirect elections), as well as by representatives of French citizens living abroad. Senators have six-year terms, with half of the seats up for election every three years.

The Senate enjoys less prominence than the first, or lower house, the National Assembly, which is elected on direct universal ballot and upon the majority of which the Government has to rely: in case of disagreement, the Assembly can in many cases have the last word, although the Senate keeps a role in some key procedures, such as constitutional amendments and most importantly legislation about itself.

Bicameralism was first introduced in France in 1795; as in many countries, it assigned the second chamber with the role of moderating the first, although for a long time as an ally of the executive. The present selection mode of the Senate dates back to the start of the Third Republic, when it was turned into what Léon Gambetta famously called a "grand council of the communes of France". Over time, it developed a sense of independence as a "guardian of the institutions" and "guardian of liberties", favoured by the fact that senators are on average older than members of the National Assembly, and join the house in the last part of their career. Debates in the Senate tend to be less tense and generally receive less media coverage.

As a result of its election relying on what is often summed up as rural mayors, it has had a right-wing majority since 1958, with only a three-year exception in 2011–2014. The left has historically opposed the very existence of a second chamber, while the right defends it, and controversies over the Senate's role are revived from time to time. The common phrase "a Senator’s pace" (un train de sénateur) mocks the upper house's perceived slow rhythm and readiness to let new legislation die.

The president of the Senate is to step in as Acting President of France in case of an incapacitation or a vacancy, which last happened in 1974. The current officeholder is Gérard Larcher. The Senate is housed inside the Luxembourg Palace in the 6th arrondissement of Paris. It is guarded by Republican Guards. In front of the building lies the Senate's garden, the Jardin du Luxembourg, open to the public.

History 

France's first experience with an upper house was under the Directory from 1795 to 1799, when the Council of Ancients was the upper chamber. There were Senates in both the First and Second Empires (the former being known as the Sénat conservateur, the latter as the French Senate), but these were only nominally legislative bodies – technically they were not legislative, but rather advisory bodies on the model of the Roman Senate.

With the Restoration in 1814, a new Chamber of Peers was created, on the model of the British House of Lords. At first it contained hereditary peers, but following the July Revolution of 1830, it became a body whose members were appointed for life. The Second Republic returned to a unicameral system after 1848, but soon after the establishment of the Second French Empire in 1852, a Senate was established as the upper chamber. In the Fourth Republic, the Senate was replaced by the Council of the Republic, but its function was largely the same. With the new Constitution of the Fifth Republic which came into force on 4 October 1958, the older name of Senate was restored.

In 2011, the Socialist Party won control of the Senate for the first time since the foundation of the Fifth Republic. In 2014, the centre-right Gaullists and its allies won back the control of the Senate; they retained their majority in 2017.

Powers 
Under the Constitution of France, the Senate has nearly the same powers as the National Assembly. Bills may be submitted by the government (projets de loi) or by either house of Parliament (propositions de loi). Because both houses may amend the bill, it may take several readings to reach an agreement between the National Assembly and the Senate. When the Senate and the National Assembly cannot agree on a bill, the administration can decide, after a procedure called commission mixte paritaire, to give the final decision to the National Assembly, whose majority is normally on the government's side, but as regarding the constitutional laws the administration must have the Senate's agreement. This does not happen frequently; usually the two houses eventually agree on the bill, or the administration decides to withdraw it. This power however gives the National Assembly a prominent role in the law-making process, especially since the administration is necessarily of the same side as the Assembly, for the Assembly can dismiss the administration through a motion of censure.

The power to pass a vote of censure, or vote of no confidence, is limited. As was the case in the Fourth Republic's constitution, new cabinets do not have to receive a vote of confidence. Also, a vote of censure can occur only after 10 percent of the members sign a petition; if rejected, those members that signed cannot sign another petition until that session of Parliament has ended. If the petition gets the required support, a vote of censure must gain an absolute majority of all members, not just those voting. If the Assembly and the Senate have politically distinct majorities, the Assembly will in most cases prevail, and open conflict between the two houses is uncommon.

The Senate is also the representative of the territories and often defends the regions and mayors, as per article 24 of the Constitution.

The Senate also serves to monitor the administration's actions by publishing many reports each year on various topics.

Composition 
Until September 2004, the Senate had 321 members, each elected to serve for a nine-year term. In that month, the term was reduced to six years, while – to reflect a growth in the country's population – the number of senators was set to increase progressively, to reach 348 by 2011. Senators had been elected in thirds every three years; this was also changed to one half of their number every three years.

President 

The president of the Senate is elected by senators from among their members. The current incumbent is Gérard Larcher. The President of the Senate is, under the Constitution of the Fifth Republic, first in the line of succession—in case of death, resignation or removal from office (only for health reasons)—to the presidency of the French Republic, becoming Acting President of the Republic until a new election can be held. This happened twice for Alain Poher—once at the resignation of Charles de Gaulle and once at the death of Georges Pompidou.

The President of the Senate also has the right to designate three of the nine members of the Constitutional Council, serving for nine years.

Election 

Senators are elected indirectly by approximately 150,000 officials, known as the grands électeurs, including regional councillors, department councillors, mayors, municipal councillors in large communes, as well as members of the National Assembly. However, 90% of the electors are delegates appointed by councillors. This system introduces a bias in the composition of the Senate favoring rural areas. As a consequence, while the political majority changes frequently in the National Assembly, the Senate has remained politically right, with one brief exception, since the foundation of the Fifth Republic, much to the displeasure of the Socialists.

This has spurred controversy, especially after the 2008 election in which the Socialist Party, despite controlling all but two of France's regions, a majority of departments, as well as communes representing more than 50% of the population, still failed to achieve a majority in the Senate. The Senate has also been accused of being a "refuge" for politicians that have lost their seats in the National Assembly. The left, led by the Socialist Party, gained control of the Senate for the first time since 1958 during the 2011 election, leading to the election of Jean-Pierre Bel at its presidency. This proved a short-lived win, as the right, led by the Union for a Popular Movement, regained the Senate three years later.

Parliamentary groups

Criticism 

As an indirectly elected house, the Senate is often criticised by political parties such as La France Insoumise and the National Rally as not being representative enough.

See also 
Congress of the French Parliament
List of presidents of the Senate of France
List of senators of France by department
Leader of the Opposition in the French Senate
Politics of France
Senator for life (France)
Women in the French Senate

Notes

References

External links 

 French Senate at Google Cultural Institute

 
France
Government of France